"Soma", originally called "Coma", is a track on the album Siamese Dream by the Smashing Pumpkins.

Overview
The song-writing credits list James Iha and Billy Corgan as co-authors, but Corgan claims that Iha only wrote the chord structure for the beginning of the song, and that Corgan himself wrote the rest. The song is said to have included up to 40 overdubbed guitar tracks. Corgan says the song "is based on the idea that a love relationship is almost the same as opium: it slowly puts you to sleep, it soothes you, and gives you the illusion of sureness and security." It was also acknowledged that song was inspired by Corgan's break-up with his ex-wife, Chris Fabian. The song also contains references to a hallucinogenic drug which was featured in Aldous Huxley's novel Brave New World and features a prominent piano figure by Mike Mills of R.E.M.

Reception
The song received positive reviews. Ned Raggett of AllMusic especially praised the song's guitar solo, while spotting elements from gothic rock and psychedelic rock. The song was also likened to Prince's "The Beautiful Ones". The critically acclaimed guitar solo was rated as the 24th in Rolling Stone's "The 25 Coolest Guitar Solos" list. The guitar solo was placed as 41st in NME's "50 Greatest Guitar Solos" list.

Tribute album cover
American band Poison the Well covered the song for Reignition Records' 2005 tribute compilation The Killer in You: A Tribute to Smashing Pumpkins. In his review of the album, their rendition was said to be "probably the best of the bunch" by AllMusic's Greg Prato.

References

Sources

1993 songs
The Smashing Pumpkins songs
Songs written by James Iha
Songs written by Billy Corgan
Song recordings produced by Billy Corgan
Song recordings produced by Butch Vig
Psychedelic songs

Grunge songs